Abdul Hadi Dawi High School, located in Kabul's District 9 near the 3rd Mikrorayon, is named after Abdul Hadi Dawi (Abdul Hadi Dawai) a renowned Afghan poet, diplomat and government official.

The High school is generally for boys and was first constructed under Babrak Karmal regime with the aid and support of former Soviet Union government that backed the Afghan Communist Party both financially and militarily at the time.

At first it was named Enqelaab (Revolution) High school in commemoration of the 7th of Saur Revolution, but during Najibullah's presidency its name was changed to Abdul Hadi Dawi High school.

See also
List of schools in Kabul
List of schools in Afghanistan
Microrayons

References

External links
 Page on Facebook
 Microrayons in Kabul

Schools in Kabul
Educational institutions established in 1984
1984 establishments in Afghanistan